Minquan County is a county in the east of Henan province, China, bordering Shandong province to the east. It is under the administration of the prefecture-level city of Shangqiu and is located at its northwest corner and is its northernmost county-level division. It has an area of 1222 square kilometers and a population of 850,000 in 2002.

Administrative divisions
As 2012, this county is divided to 6 towns, 10 townships and 2 ethic townships.
Towns

Townships

Ethnic townships
Bodang Hui Township
Huji Hui Township

Climate

Notable persons
 Xu Zhiyong

References

County-level divisions of Henan
Shangqiu